"Meleğim" is a song by French-Algerian singer Soolking featuring French singer Dadju. It was released on 7 February 2020. It was written by Dadju, Soolking and Raphaël Nyadjiko. Nyadjiko also produced the song.

Charts

Weekly charts

Year-end charts

Certifications

References 

2020 singles
2020 songs
Dadju songs
French-language songs